The Scotch Whisky Experience is a whisky visitor attraction located on Castlehill in the Old Town of Edinburgh, immediately adjacent to the esplanade of Edinburgh Castle.  The centre offers tours and whisky tutoring sessions, alongside a shop, corporate spaces and Amber Restaurant & Whisky Bar.

History
Opened in 1988, the Scotch Whisky Experience is located in the former premises of the Castlehill School.  Although the school was mixed, boys and girls were kept apart by separate sets of stairways – a design feature which the building still maintains.  Due to falling school numbers, the school closed in 1951, fulfilling various roles afterwards, including a catering school, an urban studies centre and a general store.

Creation
In July 1987, 19 individual Scotch whisky companies jointly invested £2m to create The Scotch Whisky Heritage Centre – a permanent attraction based on the history and development of Scotch whisky. The new attraction opened on 5 May 1988, changing its name to The Scotch Whisky Experience in 2006.

Recent developments
In 2008, the attraction became home to the world's largest collection of Scotch whisky, featuring 3,384 bottles. The collection had been built up over 35 years by Brazilian whisky enthusiast Claive Vidiz, who believed it only right that the collection return to its home country.  The collection is housed in a specially designed glass and marble vault and was opened by then Scottish First Minister, Alex Salmond, in May 2009.

The attraction's shop underwent a £1m refurbishment in 2012, to incorporate a host of new features, including an interactive tasting map and touch-screen distillery guide.  During the same year, the International Spirits Challenge was held at the venue for the first time  and it became home to the world's largest bottle of single malt whisky.

In 2013, the attraction celebrated its 25th birthday, which included the launch of an anniversary blend and the unveiling of a one-off commemorative Quaich.  Amber Restaurant and Whisky Bar – located in the vaults of the attraction – also underwent a refurbishment, unveiling a new bar which offered over 360 different whiskies from across Scotland.

The attraction's six-year, £7m programme of refurbishments came to an end in 2015 with an upgrade of the building's corporate spaces.

Visitor numbers
In 2013, 300,000 people visited the attraction, with more than 155,000 taking the tour. These figures rose to 308,000 people in 2014, with 157,000 taking the tour. While visitors from traditional markets made up the bulk of visitors, people from emerging whisky markets, including China, Brazil and India, made up a large proportion of visitors.

Awards
 Scottish Tourist Board (VisitScotland) – 5* Visitor Attraction
 Green Tourism Business Scheme – Silver 
 Distillery Experience Awards – ‘Best Educational Experience’ – Winner 2014
 British Travel Awards – ‘Best Leisure Attraction’ – Bronze Medal 2014
 Icons of Whisky – ‘Best Whisky Attraction’ – Winner 2013
 Association of Scottish Visitor Attractions –‘Scotland’s Best Visitor Attraction’ – Winner 2011

References

External links
 Official website

Royal Mile
Scotch whisky
Tourist attractions in Edinburgh